Soltan Nasir (also Romanized as Solţān Naşīr; also known as Sultān Nasīr) is a village in Kuhestan Rural District, in the Central District of Nain County, Isfahan Province, Iran. At the 2006 census, its population was 22, in 8 families.

References 

Populated places in Nain County